The Epynt clearance (Welsh: Cliriad Epynt) refers to the forced eviction of the Mynydd Epynt community in Powys, Wales, where 200 men, women and children were evicted from their homes which included 54 farms and a pub. The eviction was carried out by the UK Ministry of Defence in 1940, creating the Sennybridge Training Area (SENTA), which is currently the largest military training area in Wales.

The phrase "Cofiwch Epynt" ("Remember Epynt") has been used in memory of the eviction in a similar manner to Cofiwch Dryweryn.

Clearance and military acquisition 
The Ministry of Defence listed a number of properties in the area for a potential acquisition as early as the First World War. The people of Mynydd Epynt remained unaware of these plans until September 1939 when an army officer, struggling with Welsh orthography, had asked children at the local school to identify and locate fifty-two homes. By December, each of these households had received a notice to vacate their property before the end of April. The letter stressed the importance of the area to the war effort and that they would be compensated for their losses.

A number of Welsh MPs and leading figures spoke out against the acquisition. However, this opposition was largely dismissed at the time as against the war effort or part of a wider anti-British sentiment. As the evictions took place during the lambing season, some farmers were granted a short extension, but all of the evictions had been completed by June 1940. The area now forms the core of the Sennybridge Training Area (SENTA), one of the largest military training zones in the UK.

Training operations destroyed most of the original structures which had formed the community of Mynydd Epynt, including chapels and their cemeteries. Despite this, the area saw the construction of an artificial village in 1988. The Fighting In Built Up Areas zone (FIBUA) saw the construction of many mock buildings, including a fake chapel with imitation gravestones.

Impact of the evictions 
Lewis drew comparisons with the end of the community in Capel Celyn, noting the comparatively young death rate of the evicted, and the belief that one resident had "cried himself to death". The historic trackways over Mynydd Epynt had long been protected as public rights of way, but all routes through the training area were closed as a result of the acquisition.

Later accounts suggest that many of the evicted believed they would return at the end of the Second World War, with accounts of people leaving their keys in locks, returning to keep the homes in a habitable condition and even continuing to plough the fields. The military had difficulty keeping some former residents away. Thomas Morgan returned to his "" house daily to light a fire in the hearth, protecting the stonework. Morgan was repeatedly warned to stop returning, but continued until his home was destroyed by explosives, with a military officer informing him that "We’ve blown up the farmhouse. You won’t need to come here anymore".

The evictions, were documented by Iorwerth Peate, the curator and founder of the Saint Fagan Folk Museum. Peate made several visits to the area, including the last day of evictions. Peate evocatively described meeting one of those evicted, at her "" home. The elderly woman sat motionless and tearful with her back to her house (Peate later discovered that the woman was 82 years old and had been born at the property, as had her father and grandfather). Wary of the solemnity of the occasion and believing he had not been noticed, Peate tried to back away when the woman suddenly asked him where he was from. Peate answered ‘’ (the Welsh name for Cardiff), to which she replied: "" ('My little one, return there as soon as you can'), "" ('it is the end of the world here'). The Welsh phrase,  has become associated with the evictions and is the title of the Welsh-language history of Mynydd Epynt published in 1997.

See also 
 Imber 
 Langford
 Tyneham
 Tottington
 The Stanford Battle Area, in Norfolk, contains six villages also taken over for military purposes.

References 

History of Wales
Forcibly depopulated communities in Wales